Corey Raymond (born September 28, 1969) is an American football coach, and former player, currently serving as the cornerbacks coach at Florida.

Playing career
Raymond played cornerback at LSU before being signed by the New York Giants as an undrafted free agent in 1992. Raymond also played for the Detroit Lions.

Coaching career
Raymond began his coaching career in 2003 at his alma mater, New Iberia High School in New Iberia, Louisiana. He then moved to Westgate High School in Iberia Parish, Louisiana from 2004 to 2005.

Starting in 2006, Raymond moved to the college coaching ranks. He interned at his college alma mater, LSU. From 2007 to 2008, he was the assistant strength and conditioning coach at LSU. From 2009 to 2010, Raymond was the cornerbacks coach at Utah State. He was also the defensive backs coach for the Indiana Hoosiers during winter 2011, but did not coach during the regular season at Indiana. Raymond then became the Nebraska Cornhuskers secondary coach for the 2011 season.

In 2012, Raymond returned to LSU as the defensive backs coach and assistant head coach. In 2017, Raymond became cornerbacks coach with Bill Busch taking over as safeties coach. In 2020, Raymond received the additional title of recruiting coordinator at LSU.

He was announced as a part of Billy Napier’s Florida staff for 2022

References

External links
 LSU profile
 

1969 births
Living people
American football cornerbacks
Detroit Lions players
LSU Tigers football coaches
LSU Tigers football players
Nebraska Cornhuskers football coaches
New York Giants players
Utah State Aggies football coaches
People from New Iberia, Louisiana
High school football coaches in Louisiana
African-American coaches of American football
African-American players of American football
21st-century African-American people
20th-century African-American sportspeople